Peel River, a watercourse that is part of the Namoi catchment within the Murray–Darling basin, is located in the North West Slopes and Plains district of New South Wales, Australia.

Course and features
The river rises on the northern slopes of the Liverpool Range, at the junction of the Great Dividing Range and Mount Royal Range, south of the village of Nundle, and flows generally north, west and north west and emerges into the Liverpool Plains near Tamworth.

From source to mouth, the river passes through or near the villages of Nundle, Woolomin and Piallamore.

The Peel River was first discovered by European settlers in 1818 by John Oxley and named by Oxley in honour of Sir Robert Peel, an important British politician at the time of its discovery by British settlers in Australia.

At Tamworth, the river is crossed by the Main North line via the heritage-listed Tamworth rail bridge, completed in 1882.

The famous Australian freshwater native fish Murray cod, Maccullochella peelii, was named after the Peel River  by Major Mitchell, who sketched and scientifically described and named one of the numerous Murray cod his men caught from the river on his 1838 expedition.

See also

 List of rivers of Australia
 Rivers of New South Wales

References

External links
 

Rivers of New South Wales
Murray-Darling basin
New England (New South Wales)
Great Dividing Range